Greyson is a given name and a surname. Notable people with the name include:

Given name
Greyson Chance (born 1997), American pop rock singer and pianist
Greyson Gilmer (born 1996), American professional wrestler
Greyson Gunheim (born 1986), free agent American football defensive end
Greyson Lambert (born 1994), American football player

Surname
Ashley Greyson, film and music video director, cinematographer, editor, and producer
Bruce Greyson, M.D. (born 1946), Professor of Psychiatry at the University of Virginia
John Greyson (born 1960), Canadian filmmaker, whose work frequently deals with gay themes
Kelly Greyson, American actress

See also
Grayson (given name)
Grayson (surname)

de:Grayson
fr:Grayson
it:Grayson
pt:Grayson
sv:Grayson
vo:Grayson